is a Japanese fashion model and beauty pageant winner of the Miss Universe Japan competition in 2003.

References

1978 births
Japanese actresses
Japanese beauty pageant winners
Japanese female models
Living people
Miss Universe 2003 contestants
Kumamoto University alumni
People from Kumamoto Prefecture
Models from Kumamoto Prefecture